James Riordan was an American from Franklin, Wisconsin who served a single one-year term in 1861 as a Democratic member of the Wisconsin State Assembly.

References 

People from Franklin, Milwaukee County, Wisconsin
19th-century American politicians
Democratic Party members of the Wisconsin State Assembly